Hilary McKay (born 12 June 1959) is a British writer of children's books. For her first novel, The Exiles, she won the 1992 Guardian Children's Fiction Prize, a once-in-a-lifetime book award judged by a panel of British children's writers.

Biography
McKay was born in Boston, Lincolnshire, the eldest of four daughters. She studied English, Zoology and Botany at St Andrews University before becoming a public protection scientist. She currently resides in Derbyshire with her husband, Kevin.

McKay says of herself as a child "I anaesthetised myself against the big bad world with large doses of literature. The local library was as familiar to me as my own home."

The Casson Family books

The Casson Family series comprises the Whitbread Award-winning Saffy's Angel (2001) and four sequels: Indigo's Star (2004), Permanent Rose (2005), which was shortlisted for the 2005 Whitbread awards, Caddy Ever After (2006), Forever Rose (2007), and prequel Caddy's World (2011). The series focuses on an English family of artists, the Cassons. The children are called Cadmium ('Caddy'), Saffron ('Saffy'), Indigo ('Indy') and Permanent Rose (Rosy Pose), and are named after paint colours (a large paint chart that hangs in the Casson family's kitchen that plays an important role in the book Saffy's Angel.) The parents' names are Eve and Bill. The first three books are written in the third person but focus on the point of view of the character in the title, whilst Caddy Ever After is written in the first person and is narrated by each of the siblings in turn, and Forever Rose is written in the first person and is narrated by Rose. Other characters featured in the books include Tom (an American boy who makes friends with Indigo and Rose whilst on a short stay in England), David (a thick-skinned and well-meaning reformed bully) and Sarah (or "wheelchair girl", as she was known to the Cassons before she met Saffron).  Caddy's World, a prequel describes a younger Caddy when Rose was first born.

Cadmium is the dreamer of the family; she loves animals and has an incredible amount of guinea-pigs and hamsters. She falls in love with her driving instructor, Michael, and it is she, initially, who looks after the other children. She loves her family, and often returns home to visit whilst studying Zoology in London. Saffron, or Saffy, is the realist; she is scornful, sarcastic, and fiercely intelligent. Really, she only wants to be loved; she often leans on her best friend Sarah for support. She discovers in the first book that she is actually the daughter of Eve's sister Linda. In "Permanent Rose" she discovers that her father is Bill (Eve's husband and father of the other children, making her both the Casson children's cousin and half-sister). Indigo is the only boy. He is music-loving and sensitive, and his best friends are Tom and David. Rose is the true artist of the family. If not stopped, she will cover the walls of their house with paintings and drawings. Eve is their ditzy mother who spends her time in the shed painting, when she isn't "hanging her young offenders" (she teaches them art on Saturday mornings) or painting murals in the local hospital. She hardly ever cooks a proper meal, so the children live on tinned food and Indigo's adventurous cooking, but she loves all her children and sees how special all of them are in their own way. Their father Bill is almost always in London and hardly ever home, although occasionally manages to save the day before disappearing back to his studio and girlfriend in London.

The Porridge Hall books

The Porridge Hall series (1994-1998) features Robin Brogan and his mother, who live in Porridge Hall on the Yorkshire coast. Once Porridge Hall was Mrs Brogan's family home, now it has been split into two houses, and she and Robin live in one half, from which Mrs Brogan also runs a bed and breakfast. The Robinson family live in the other half, and the two families are firm friends.

The Robinson children are the twins, Peregrine and Antoniette, who have abbreviated their names to Perry and Ant, their brother Sundance, and their sister Beany. Sundance got his nickname because Perry and Ant used to play Butch Cassidy, and Sundance was always the Sundance Kid. Beany, whose real name is Elizabeth, got her name because she declared, at a young age, that she wanted to be a bean when she grew up. She actually wanted to be a doctor in South Africa and didn't know how to tell her parents.

Other characters include Dan, a former enemy of Robin's, and later his best friend, and a mysterious girl called Harriet, who appears in the second book, The Amber Cat. Storytelling is a key theme in the second and third books, whilst beachcombing and life by the sea feature large in all three books.

The books have been published as audiobooks, with the first two read by Nigel Lambert, The Amber Cat also by Ron Keith, and Dolphin Luck by Judy Bennett. Dog Friday has been adapted into a German film, Ein Hund namens Freitag. Besides German, the trilogy has been translated into Dutch and Estonian as well, and Dog Friday has also been translated into Czech, Danish, Greek, Polish, Spanish, and Thai, and The Amber Cat into French.

Awards
The Exiles won the 1992 Guardian Children's Fiction Prize
 The Exiles At Home won the 1994 Nestlé Smarties Book Prize in ages category 9–11 years and overall
Saffy's Angel won the 2002 Whitbread Children's Book Award
Permanent Rose was shortlisted for the 2005 Whitbread Award
The Skylarks' War (2018) won the 2019 Costa Children's Book Award

Selected works

The Time of Green Magic
The Skylarks' War
Straw into Gold: Hilary McKay's Fairy Tales

Binny
Binny for Short
Binny in Secret
Binny Bewitched

Casson Family
Saffy's Angel
Indigo's Star
Permanent Rose
Caddy Ever After
Forever Rose
Caddy's World (takes place before Saffy's Angel)

Exiles
The Exiles
The Exiles At Home
The Exiles In Love

Paradise House
The Treasure in the Garden
The Echo in the Chimney
The Zoo in the Attic
The Magic in the Mirror
The Surprise Party
Keeping Cottontail

Porridge Hall
Dog Friday
The Amber Cat
Dolphin Luck

Pudding Bag School
A Birthday Wish
Cold Enough for Snow
A Strong Smell of Magic

For younger readers
The Story of Bear
Happy and Glorious
Practically Perfect
Charlie and the Great Escape

References

Citations
Hilary McKay wins top kids' books prize, BBC, 8 January 2003.
CBBC Newsround chats to Hilary McKay, BBC, 8 January 2003.

External links

 
 
 Hilary McKay at Library of Congress Authorities — with 26 catalogue records

English children's writers
Guardian Children's Fiction Prize winners
Living people
Alumni of the University of St Andrews
1959 births
People from Boston, Lincolnshire